The 2018 World Sprint Speed Skating Championships were held at the Jilin Provincial Speed Skating Rink in Changchun, China, from 3 to 4 March 2018.

Schedule
All times are local (UTC+8).

Medal summary

Medal table

Medalists

References

External links
ISU website

 
2018 in Chinese sport
World Sprint Championships
2017 2018 Sprint Speed Skating Championships
March 2018 sports events in China
2018 World Sprint Speed Skating Championships
2018 Sprint